The Del Río–Ciudad Acuña International Bridge is an international bridge which crosses the Rio Grande connecting the United States-Mexico border cities of Del Rio, Texas and Ciudad Acuña. The bridge is also known as "Del Río International Bridge", "Puente Acuña" and "Puente Ciudad Acuña-Ciudad Del Río".

Description
The American side of the Del Río–Ciudad Acuña International Bridge is currently owned by the City of Del Rio, which also manages it. The bridge was constructed in 1930 and rebuilt in 1987.

Border crossing

The Del Rio Texas Port of Entry is located at the Del Río – Ciudad Acuña International Bridge. The current port of entry facility was rebuilt by the General Services Administration in 2004.

2021 Del Rio Bridge migrant surge 
In mid-September 2021, a large group of migrants, almost all from Haiti, attempted to enter the U.S. by crossing the shallow Rio Grande and seeking shelter beneath the bridge, where they lived in unhealthy conditions. The crowd grew from a few hundred to thousands within a week, initially overwhelming authorities. By September 24, 2021, all of the approximately 15,000 migrants were cleared from their encampment underneath the bridge: the U.S. Department of Homeland Security reported that about 8,000 migrants "decided to return to Mexico voluntarily"; 2,000 migrants were expelled to Haiti on 17 DHS-organized flights, and 5,000 were placed in DHS processing "to determine whether they will be expelled or placed in immigration removal proceedings."  The U.S. authorities sought to deter more people from rushing the border. Some of the migrants are applying for asylum in the U.S. Of those permitted to remain in the U.S. pending hearings (a process that could take several years due to persistent immigration court backlogs), some were permitted to go to New York, Boston and Miami. The Biden administration's handling of the migrants was criticized by both immigration advocates (who pressed for more migrants to be allowed to stay in the U.S.) and conservatives (who referred to the incident as Whip Gate).

References

International bridges in Texas
International bridges in Coahuila
Toll bridges in Texas
Bridges completed in 1930
Buildings and structures in Val Verde County, Texas
Transportation in Val Verde County, Texas
Road bridges in Texas
Toll bridges in Mexico
Del Rio, Texas